Top Dawg Entertainment (TDE) is an American independent record label founded in 2004, by CEO Anthony "Top Dawg" Tiffith. Terrence "Punch" Henderson is president of the label. There are currently eleven artists signed to the label: the label's flagship artists, Black Hippy members Jay Rock, Ab-Soul and Schoolboy Q, as well as Isaiah Rashad, SZA, Lance Skiiiwalker, SiR, Reason, Zacari, Ray Vaughn, and Doechii. TDE is also the former label of Kendrick Lamar. The label houses a production division that includes Digi+Phonics, THC, King Blue, Kal Banx and Derek "MixedByAli" Ali. The musical focus of the label is predominantly album-oriented and progressive rap.

History

1997–2012
In 1997, Anthony Tiffith (also known by his monikers, Dude Dawg and Top Dawg) embarked on a career in music as a record producer, producing for rappers such as The Game and Juvenile, among others. In 2003, Tiffith found a then 15-year-old Kendrick Lamar, a Compton native, who at the time went by K.Dot and had just released his first mixtape, which gained recognition and earned the young rapper some local buzz in his area. Tiffith saw potential in Lamar, signing him onto the label from the strength of the rapper's debut mixtape. It wasn't until 2005 that TDE started to gain success with another California-based rapper, Jay Rock. Following Rock's signing, TDE signed joint venture deals with Warner Bros. and later Asylum Records. However, following the merger, TDE began planning an exit strategy after the labels failed to handle Rock's debut Follow Me Home properly.

In 2007, Carson-based rapper Ab-Soul was added to the Top Dawg roster. On May 10, 2008, the label released a compilation mixtape titled Do It Nigga Squad, Volume 1, which features songs by members of the label's roster, with other appearances coming from fellow American rappers Schoolboy Q, Lil Wayne and will.i.am. All songs on the mixtape were mixed by Top Dawg's resident engineer Derek "MixedByAli" Ali, much like a majority of their releases are.

In 2009, Los Angeles-based rapper Schoolboy Q signed with TDE after being affiliated with the label since 2006. In 2009, once they were all signed to the label, Schoolboy Q suggested that he, Lamar, Rock and Ab-Soul form a rap group. They all agreed and all four artists formed the hip hop group Black Hippy.

In March 2012, MTV reported that TDE closed a joint venture deal with Interscope Records and Aftermath Entertainment. Under the new deal, Kendrick Lamar's second studio album, Good Kid, M.A.A.D City would be jointly released via Top Dawg, Interscope and Aftermath. In August 2012, during "TDEFamAppreciationWeek", they released solo tracks from each of the Black Hippy members and a video of Lamar and Q acting out on the tour bus.

2013–2014
In June 2013, Top Dawg announced they were planning to sign two more artists, with the first being reported as Tennessee native, Isaiah Rashad. On July 14, it was revealed Top Dawg had signed an up-and-coming female singer named SZA to the label. In August 2013, during an interview with Vibe, CEO Anthony Tiffith spoke on comparisons to Death Row Records, another label based in Southern California, run by Comptonite Marion "Suge" Knight, that had released albums from Dr. Dre, Snoop Dogg, Tupac Shakur and others during the 1990s. Tiffith also said that he learned several lessons from his first major-label contract; a deal with Warner Bros. Records for Jay Rock, that lasted from 2006 until 2010. Tennessee-based rapper Isaiah Rashad's signing to TDE was officially announced on September 20, 2013.

In October 2013, at the BET Hip Hop Awards, Kendrick Lamar won five awards, including Album of the Year and Lyricist of the Year, the latter of which he also won the year before. At the award ceremony, Schoolboy Q performed his debut album's lead single "Collard Greens", with Lamar following him, performing "Money Trees", alongside Jay Rock. Lamar, Rock and Schoolboy Q were also featured in a cypher, along with Ab-Soul and newcomer Isaiah Rashad, which was presented by BET. In an October 2013 interview with XXL, co-president Terrence "Punch" Henderson confirmed that the original reports of the record label being distributed by Interscope Records were incorrect. He said only Schoolboy Q and Kendrick Lamar ever had solo record deals with Interscope Records, while they were currently looking for a distribution deal for the entire label.

After not releasing an album the entire year, on December 21, 2013, CEO Anthony "Top Dawg" Tiffith revealed that he plans on the entire label's roster releasing solo albums in 2014.

2015–2018
On February 29, 2016, Top Dawg hinted at two new label signees, as well as scheduled releases for each of the label's artists' for 2016. On May 20, Top Dawg officially announced the signing of Lance Skiiiwalker. On July 1, 2016, TDE CEO Anthony Tiffith announced the label will be touring as a group after the four artists album releases in 2016. The TDE tour featured Kendrick Lamar, ScHoolboy Q, Jay Rock, Ab-Soul, Isaiah Rashad, SZA, Lance Skiiiwalker and co-president/occasional rapper Punch. On January 19, 2017, TDE officially announced the signing of Inglewood, California singer SiR. On April 28, 2017, SZA announced she signed her first major-label recording contract with RCA Records.

On February 9, 2018, the label released Black Panther: The Album, the soundtrack for the Marvel Studios superhero film Black Panther (2018), executively produced by Anthony "Top Dawg" Tiffith and Kendrick Lamar. 
In 2018, TDE announced The Championship Tour featuring artists from the label, from May to June. On August 8, the label announced the signing of Carson, California rapper Reason. Later in the year, the company formed a sports agency division, signing former LSU running back Derrius Guice as the first athlete. On January 25, 2019, TDE officially revealed that Zacari is signed to the label.

2019–present
In 2019, former co-president Dave Free announced he is leaving Top Dawg Entertainment, saying, "None of the tactics we used back in the day to break Kendrick, Ab-Soul, Jay Rock or Schoolboy would work now. It’s a whole new game. Blogs were very influential back then and I’d have to build a lot of relationships with blogs and now it’s just more about streaming. You have to have the relationships with the streaming sites and it can’t just be a fake relationship." Dave Free met Kendrick Lamar when the two were in high school as they later co-founded the service company pgLang in 2020.

In 2021, Kendrick Lamar announced he would also be leaving the label, with his next album, Mr. Morale & the Big Steppers, being his last for TDE. It was released on May 13, 2022. On August 25, 2021, TDE announced the signing of Long Beach rapper Ray Vaughn, who signed in 2020.

Other ventures
In 2014, TDE started the inaugural Christmas concert and toy drive in Watts, Los Angeles, including performances by TDE's roster of artists as well as donations to families in need. The fundraising event has been an annual concert for the holidays, and had guest appearances from Rihanna, E-40, and Chris Brown.

Advocacy
In May 2018, it was announced that Kendrick Lamar was planning a departure from Spotify. The announcement came after he heard the streaming platform intended to ban fellow rapper XXXTentacion from their editorial and algorithmic playlists for his alleged acts of violence against women. Lamar had been a fan of XXXTentacion's music. He tweeted a link to his debut album 17 accompanied by praise for the controversial rapper's "raw thoughts." The removal of XXXTentacion as well as R. Kelly arrived in accordance to Spotify's new Hate Content & Hateful Conduct policy. Conceived in light of the #MeToo movement, the hateful conduct policy sought to promote "openness, diversity, tolerance and respect" by removing content that promotes, advocates, or incites hatred and violence against an individual or group based on characteristics. The policy was especially poorly received by recording artists and executives working in hip-hop, the best-selling genre in the U.S. music industry, and the abrupt manner Spotify instituted it generated complaints. Terrence Punch, president of Top Dawg Entertainment responded on Twitter by remarking, "Whoa. Are they censoring the music? That’s dangerous." According to The Guardian, a representative for Lamar personally contacted Daniel Ek to air his frustrations with the policy, claiming it was censorship. Bloomberg reported that the representative reached out to Spotify Chief Executive Officer Daniel Ek and head of artist relations Troy Carter, threatening to pull his music if the company kept the policy as it stood. Anthony "Top Dawg" Tiffith, CEO of Top Dawg Entertainment, confirmed he threatened to remove music from the service in an interview with Billboard. Tiffith stated, "I reached out to Troy over there, we had a conversation and I expressed how I felt about it, about censorship, how you can’t do artists that way. I don’t think it’s right for artists to be censored, especially in our culture." In response to the criticism, Spotify reversed their policy and reinstated XXXTentacion's music back onto playlists after other artists followed suit in threatening to pull their musical works.

Artists

Current acts

Former acts

In-house producers
Top Dawg Entertainment houses a production team named Digi+Phonics, composed of music producers Dave Free, Willie B, Tae Beast and Sounwave. They have composed the majority of the production on many of the TDE releases.

King Blue, also known as Blue The Misfit, was once half of the musical duo Sore Losers and is also signed to Top Dawg as a producer, producing songs such as Kendrick Lamar's "P&P", Schoolboy Q's "To tha Beat (F’d Up)" and Mac Miller's "Down Them".

The production team THC, a duo of producers, have produced several songs by members of Black Hippy, including Kendrick Lamar's "Cartoon & Cereal" and "m.A.A.d City", as well as Schoolboy Q's "Collard Greens", among several other tracks.

Current
 Anthony "Top Dawg" Tiffith
 Digi+Phonics
Sounwave
Tae Beast
Willie B
 King Blue
 Derek "MixedByAli" Ali
 THC
 Kal Banx

Former
Dave Free

Discography

The discography of Top Dawg Entertainment currently consists of 25 studio albums, two compilation albums, six extended plays (EPs) and 17 mixtapes. Overall the label has sold more than ten million records in the US alone.

References

External links

American record labels
Hip hop discographies
American hip hop record labels
Record labels established in 2004
American independent record labels
2004 establishments in California